Yuval Zvi Jakobovich (born 9 November 1992) is an Israeli footballer who plays as a midfielder. In 2016 he went with fellow Israeli player, Alon Netzer to play in Romania for Liga I club ASA Târgu Mureș.

References

1992 births
Living people
Israeli footballers
Association football midfielders
Hapoel Kfar Saba F.C. players
ASA 2013 Târgu Mureș players
Maccabi Petah Tikva F.C. players
F.C. Ashdod players
Israeli Premier League players
Liga Leumit players
Liga I players
Israeli expatriate footballers
Expatriate footballers in Romania
Israeli expatriate sportspeople in Romania
Footballers from Kfar Saba